BSN may refer to:

 Bachelor of Science in Nursing, a nursing degree
 Badan Standardisasi Nasional, an Indonesian standardization agency
 Bally Sports North, American regional sports network owned and operated by Bally Sports
 Baloncesto Superior Nacional, basketball league in Puerto Rico
 Bank Simpanan Nasional, Malaysia
 Biotechnology Society of Nepal
 Blue Square North, English football league
 Body sensor network
 Boussois-Souchon-Neuvesel, French company, renamed Groupe Danone in 1994
 The British School in the Netherlands, The Hague
 Broadcasting System of Niigata, Japan
 Burgerservicenummer, the national identification number in the Netherlands